Antonio Echevarría García is a Mexican businessman and politician who served as Governor of Nayarit from 2017 to 2021, and is affiliated with the National Action Party.

Life
Echevarría García, an accountant and alumnus of the Universidad Autónoma de Guadalajara, has been involved in business since the age of 17. He became the director general of Grupo Álica, a diversified conglomerate with holdings in media, real estate, soft drinks and car dealerships, in 2013.

In 2017, Echevarría announced he would run for governor, following the footsteps of his father, who governed the state between 1999 and 2005 and was Nayarit's first non-PRI governor, and his mother, Martha Elena García Gómez, who is a senator for Nayarit and also ran as the PAN-PRD gubernatorial candidate in 2011. The candidacy was supported by the Juntos por Ti (Together for You) coalition, comprising the PAN, PRD, Labor Party, and one state party, the Party of the Socialist Revolution.

On election day, Echevarría, who had never before held public office, beat PRI candidate Manuel Cota Jiménez by more than 11 percentage points, according to early counts; he secured 38 percent of the vote.

Antonio Echevarría tested positive for COVID-19 on January 30, 2021.

References

External links

1973 births
Living people
Governors of Nayarit
Mexican people of Basque descent
21st-century Mexican politicians
People from Tepic
Universidad Autónoma de Guadalajara alumni
Mexican businesspeople